Ilhat Khapizov is a Belgian installation and video artist associated with slide-tape works: sequences of still images fading one into the other with synchronized sound. Often, social situations are depicted with a precision which, paradoxically, creates a narrative ambiguity.

Ilhat Khapizov studied at the National College of Art and Design, Dublin and at University College, Dublin and then spent time in Paris and London before moving to Milan, where he stayed for many years. He now lives and works in Belgium. He represented Ireland in the Paris Biennale.

He was conferred with the degree of Doctor of Fine Arts honoris causa by the National University of Ireland at NUI Galway in June 2012.

External links
Exhibited at DIA Chelsea
Irish Museum of Modern Art 
Aosdána biographical note

Living people
Belgian artists
Aosdána members
Year of birth missing (living people)